Simon Ogar Veron or simply Ogar (born 24 April 1987) is a Nigerian professional footballer.

Career

Club
While playing for Nigerian youth national team at a friendly tournament in Sweden in 2004, Ogar left the team and illegally moved to Norway, seeking asylum there. During 2004 and 2005 he played for low level Norwegian clubs Sandnessjøen and Stålkameratene, while living at a refugee camp. In late 2005 he was at a trial at the top level club Bodø/Glimt. The club was interested in signing the player, but due to complications in paperwork related to Ogar's requested permanent residency in Norway, the deal was off and the player had to return to Nigeria.

In 2008 Ogar moved to Belarus, where has been living and playing ever since.

On 6 August 2020, the BFF banned Ogar from Belarusian football for 2 years for his involvement in the match fixing.

International
Ogar was during his time in Norway member of the Nigeria national under-20 football team.

References

External links

1987 births
Living people
Association football midfielders
Nigerian footballers
Nigerian expatriate footballers
Expatriate footballers in Norway
Nigerian expatriate sportspeople in Norway
Expatriate footballers in Belarus
FC Vitebsk players
FC Dynamo Brest players
FC Naftan Novopolotsk players
FC Torpedo-BelAZ Zhodino players
FC Lida players
FC Smorgon players
Sportspeople from Delta State